William Bernard McCabe (1801–1891) was an Irish author of historical romances. Born in Dublin, he worked as a journalist for local newspapers before moving to London in 1833. He was employed by The Morning Chronicle and The Morning Herald to provide coverage of parliamentary debates and to review new books. He published A Catholic History of England in 1847-54. McCabe's's historical novels include Florine, Princess of Burgundy (1855) and Adelaide, Queen of Italy (1856). After retiring, he settled in Brittany.

References 
 
 http://www.djo.org.uk/indexes/authors/william-bernard-maccabe.html

English male journalists
Writers of historical romances
Writers from Dublin (city)
1801 births
1891 deaths
19th-century British journalists
19th-century Irish novelists
19th-century British historians
19th-century English male writers
19th-century English novelists